The 1984–85 NCAA Division III men's ice hockey season began in November 1984 and concluded on March 23 of the following year. This was the 12th season of Division III college ice hockey.

After the collapse of the entire second-tier division in 1984, most programs downgraded to Division III. As a result the size of the third division rose dramatically.

Despite the SUNYAC conference not sponsoring ice hockey, the member schools began holding an informal conference tournament that took place just prior to the ECAC West Men's Tournament. All game were considered conference games for determining ECAC standings.

Regular season

Season tournaments

Standings

1985 NCAA tournament

Note: * denotes overtime period(s)

See also
 1984–85 NCAA Division I men's ice hockey season

References

External links

 
NCAA